German, French + Rare Recordings is the German compilation album by English rock band The Searchers. The collection includes their hits as "Needles and Pins", "Don't Throw Your Love Away" or "When You Walk In The Room" sung in German and French and is a complete catalogue of their singles and rarities issued on Liberty Records in the sixties (songs that were never released on CD or LP before). This was the band's second rarities album, the former being The Searchers Play The System – Rarities, Oddities & Flipsides, which was released in 1987.

Overview
The album came out in 1990 on Repertoire Records (on vinyl LP and CD simultaneously). It was compiled by Wilfried Zinzow, who worked on many collectors editions for this label. In addition to the songs mentioned above, there is the last Searchers’ British single "I Don't Want To Be The One" / "Hollywood", Chris Curtis’ solo single "Aggravation" / "Have I Done Something Wrong" (including session work by Jimmy Page or John Paul Jones) or "Medley" of their hits (released only in Spain as a B-side to "Goodbye My Love" in 1981). According to the sleeve note, as some original master tapes were no more available, few tracks have been cut from vintage vinyl records.

Track listing

Personnel
The Searchers
 Mike Pender – lead guitar, lead vocals, backing vocals
 John McNally – rhythm guitar, lead and backing vocals
 Tony Jackson – bass guitar, lead and backing vocals
 Chris Curtis – drums, lead and backing vocals
 Frank Allen – bass guitar, lead and backing vocals
 John Blunt – drums
 Billy Adamson – drums
Additional musicians and production
 Tony Hatch – producer (3-12, 15, 16), piano
 Kenny Young – producer (17-24)
 Peter Collins – producer (1, 2)
 Accompaniment directed by Johnny Harris (13, 14)
 Jimmy Page – guitar (13, 14)
 Joe Moretti – guitar (13, 14) 
 John Paul Jones – bass guitar (13, 14)
 Vic Flick – guitar (13, 14)
 Bobby Graham – drums (13, 14)

References

1990 compilation albums
The Searchers (band) albums